Elcaset is a short-lived audio format jointly developed by Sony, Panasonic, and Teac in 1976, building on an idea introduced 20 years earlier in the RCA tape cartridge.

In 1976, it was widely felt that the compact cassette was never likely to be capable of the same levels of performance that was available from reel-to-reel systems, yet clearly the cassette had advantages in terms of convenience. The Elcaset system was intended to marry the performance of reel-to-reel with cassette convenience, but be more of a compromise on size between the two than the RCA cassette is. The name "Elcaset" may simply mean L-cassette, or large cassette, since the " tape inside is double the " width found in compact cassettes. They were divided into four tracks.

The cassette itself looks similar to a compact cassette, only larger—about twice the size. Another notable difference from compact cassettes is that the tape is withdrawn from the cassette when run through the transport mechanism so that the manufacturing tolerances of the cassette shell will not affect sound quality. The top-of-the-line Elcaset decks also have all the features of deluxe open-reel decks, such as separate heads for erasing, recording, and playback; remote control, and heavy-duty transports for low wow & flutter.

The system is technically sound, but a nearly complete failure in the marketplace, with a very low take-up by a few audiophiles only. Apart from the problem of the bulky cassettes, the performance of compact cassettes had improved dramatically with the use of new materials such as chromium dioxide, Dolby B noise reduction, and better manufacturing quality. For most people, the quality of compact cassettes was adequate, and the benefits of the expensive Elcaset system limited. Audiophiles turned away from Elcaset and towards high-end compact cassette decks from companies like Nakamichi, which began making very high-quality tape decks using the compact audio cassette in late 1973, even three years before the Elcaset was released. The tapes they made could be played on any compact cassette machine. Also, the Elcaset machines were expensive. Elcaset began a fast fade-out in 1978, after the Northern Audio Fair in Harrogate, Yorks.

The Elcaset system was abandoned in 1980, when all the remaining systems were sold off in Finland.

In 2017, musician Jeremy Heiden released his album Blue Wicked on Elcaset, along with several other older formats, including MiniDisc, Digital Compact Cassette, and Compact Cassette.

See also
 RCA tape cartridge

References

Notes

External links
 Kees Stravers. "The Sony Elcaset cassette tape machine" (an enthusiast's page). Kees's Computer Home. Last accessed on 14 August 2007.

Audio storage
Products introduced in 1976
Discontinued media formats
Tape recording